The 2011–12 Longwood Lancers men's basketball team represented Longwood University during the 2011–12 NCAA Division I men's basketball season. The team was led by ninth-year head coach Mike Gillian, and played their home games at Willett Hall as a Division I independent school. This was their final season as an independent school; on January 24, 2012, the Big South Conference formally added Longwood as their twelfth member, to begin with the 2012–13 season.

Last season
The Lancers had a record of 12–19.

Roster

Schedule 

|-
!colspan=9 style="background:#002B7F; color:#AFAAA3;"| Regular season

References

Longwood Lancers men's basketball seasons
Longwood
Longwood Lancers men's basketball
Longwood Lancers men's basketball